The 1927–28 National Hurling League was the second edition of the National Hurling League (NHL).

The nine participating teams were Cork, Dublin, Galway, Kilkenny, Laois, Limerick, Offaly, Tipperary and Wexford who agreed to play an eight-game format whereby each team would play each of their eight rivals once with two points awarded for a win and one point awarded for a drawn game. The team with the most points at the completion of the season would be declared National Hurling League champions.

 won the league after securing 14 points from their eight games.  were second with 12 points.

National Hurling League

Table

Results

References

National Hurling League seasons
League
League